Thomas Francis Dicksee (1819–1895) was a British painter. He was a portraitist and painter of historical, genre subjects
often inspired by the works of Shakespeare.

Life and career
Thomas Francis Dicksee was born in London on 13 December 1819 and was the pupil of H. P. Briggs. He exhibited at the Royal Academy from 1841 until the year of his death. His brother, John Robert Dicksee, was also a painter, and his children, Sir Francis Dicksee and Margaret, likewise became painters. In The Dictionary of Victorian Painters, Herbert Dicksee is given as his son also, but according to the City of London School, where Herbert taught, he was the son of John Robert Dicksee.

Thomas Dicksee also produced a series of portraits of family members, and also painted idealised portraits, including the Shakespearean characters Ophelia, Beatrice, Miranda and Ariel. A Juliet is in the Sunderland Art Gallery, and At the Opera is in the collection of Leicester Art Gallery. A portrait of Lady Teasdale is in the Adelaide Art Gallery, Australia and an Ophelia (1875) is in the Mead Art Museum, Amherst, Massachusetts. Dicksee would become particularly well known for his depictions of Shakespearean heroines and exhibited a total of seven at the Royal Academy. Other oil paintings have been seen in several auctions including Christ of the Cornfield, Distant Thoughts, and paintings of Beatrice, Miranda, and Amy Robsart. He died in London on 6 November 1895.

Gallery

References

Christopher Wood, Christopher Newall, Margaret Richardson. Victorian Painters: The Text  (Antique Collectors' Club Ltd, 1995)

External links

 
T F Dicksee - biography and works (ArtMagick)

1819 births
1895 deaths
19th-century English painters
English male painters
British genre painters
Orientalist painters
19th-century English male artists